Vučji zub (trans. "Wolf's tooth") is at 1805 m one of the higher peaks in the Orjen masif.

The boundary between the Ottoman Empire, Austro-Hungarian Empire and the principality of Montenegro ran across Vučji zub until 1879. Vučji zub is still today the border stone between Montenegro and Bosnia and Herzegovina.

Vučji zub resembles a horn and is an interesting climbing destination in the Orjen range.

See also

 Orjen

Mountains of Montenegro
Bosnia and Herzegovina–Montenegro border
Orjen